Edafe Egbedi (born 5 August 1993) is a Nigerian footballer who plays for Ariana FC. He is notably a right-footed winger.

Career
At national team level, he played for Nigeria at the 2011 FIFA U-20 World Cup, scoring the decisive goal when Nigeria beat England 1-0 in the Round of 16, to reach the Quarter-final stage. He also played seven games for Nigeria at the 2009 FIFA U-17 World Cup, helping his team all the way to the Final.

On 28 August 2014 Egbedi was loaned out from AGF to Skive IK for the remaining of 2014.

Egbedi chose to terminate its contract with AGF in January 2015 

He played for Landskrona BoIS in the Swedish Division 1 and Superettan between 2017 and 2018.

References

External links
official AGF profile
National team profile at FIFA.com
Official Danish League stats
"Edafe Egbedi klar för Prespa Birlik" at KSP Prespa Birlik

1993 births
Living people
Nigerian footballers
Nigerian expatriate footballers
Expatriate men's footballers in Denmark
Expatriate footballers in Sweden
Nigerian expatriate sportspeople in Denmark
Nigerian expatriate sportspeople in Sweden
Aarhus Gymnastikforening players
Landskrona BoIS players
Skive IK players
KSF Prespa Birlik players
Norrby IF players
Danish Superliga players
Danish 1st Division players
Superettan players
Ettan Fotboll players
2013 African U-20 Championship players
Nigeria under-20 international footballers
Association football midfielders